Ellen Siminoff (born 1967, Milwaukee, Wisconsin) is an entrepreneur and investor. Frequently quoted in The New York Times as an Internet industry commentator, Siminoff was named one of Forbes magazine's Masters of Information in 2005.

Along with her husband, David Siminoff, Ellen is co-founder and former chief executive officer of Shmoop.

Life and education
Siminoff obtained a BA in economics from Princeton University and an MBA from Stanford University, where she met her husband David Siminoff while they were students at the Stanford Graduate School of Business.

Career

Yahoo! 

Siminoff was a founding executive at Yahoo!, working at the company from 1996 to 2002. She started by running corporate and business development, running mergers and acquisitions after the departure of J. J. Healy. Later Siminoff moved to Senior Vice President of Entertainment and Small Business, with Toby Coppel and Jeff Weiner taking over corporate development. Six months later, Yahoo announced on April 13, 2002, that Siminoff decided to leave the company in order to spend more time with family, and would stay through until the end of the year. Her departure was part of a high-profile exodus of Yahoo executives, including CEO Timothy Koogle, CFO Gary Valenzuela, sales chief Anil Singh, head of international operations Heather Killen, and marketing head Karen Edwards.

Efficient Frontier 

Siminoff was former chairman and CEO of Efficient Frontier. In July 2006 Bloomberg Businessweek noted that Efficient Frontier was the largest buyer of search advertising keywords on Google, and in March 2008 Silicon Alley Insider named Efficient Frontier one of the 25 most valuable privately held companies in Silicon Valley, valued at an estimated $275 million. Adobe Inc. bought Efficient Frontier for $400 million in 2012.

Mozilla 

On March 24, 2014, Siminoff and two other board members of the Mozilla Corporation resigned from the board in advance of Brendan Eich's appointment as CEO of Mozilla. Eich was noted for his donation of $1,000 to California Proposition 8, which called for the banning of same-sex marriage in California. Eich resigned from Mozilla 11 days later, on April 3, 2014.

Other board positions 

Siminoff sits on the board of directors for Journal Media Group, U.S. Auto Parts, and Zynga. Siminoff formerly was a board member at SolarWinds.

References

Living people
American computer businesspeople
American technology chief executives
American technology company founders
American women company founders
American company founders
American women chief executives
Businesspeople from Milwaukee
Princeton University alumni
Stanford Graduate School of Business alumni
Yahoo! employees
People from Los Altos Hills, California
1967 births
21st-century American women